Son of Rosemary is a 1997 horror novel by American writer Ira Levin. It is the sequel to Rosemary's Baby.

Plot
The novel begins in November 1999, with Rosemary Woodhouse waking up in a long-term care facility. She has lain in a coma since 1973. Wholly unharmed, Rosemary soon learns that her coma resulted from a spell the coven cast on her when they discovered that she planned to run away with her young son, Andy (who was 7 years old at the time). In her absence, Andy was raised by Minnie and Roman Castevet, the leaders of the coven. Rosemary recovered only after the coven's last member died.

Rosemary finds that Andy, now 33 years old, is the popular and charismatic leader of an international charitable organization. Mother and son are reunited, and Rosemary instantly becomes world-famous both for her remarkable recovery and as Andy's long-lost mother. Rosemary is also struck and puzzled by a repeated reference to "roast mules", an anagram that many people continually mention.

Andy assures his mother that he has rebelled against the coven's evil influence. He says he uses his powers to achieve world peace, but a long chain of deadly events leads Rosemary to believe that her son has unwittingly become the Antichrist and is ushering in the end of the world. Her fears are proven when a candle-lighting event that Andy has organized to celebrate the new millennium unleashes a deadly virus that destroys all human life. In the wake of the destruction, Satan returns to Earth and drags Rosemary into Hell.

Rosemary abruptly awakens to find that it is 1965 again and that she is still married to Guy Woodhouse. The events of the entire first novel and that of the second up to that point have all been Rosemary's vivid dream. Rosemary and Guy receive a call from Rosemary's friend Edward "Hutch" Hutchins (who died in her dream), who offers the couple a rent-free apartment in the Dakota Apartments (the model for the Bramford, their apartment building in the first novel) for one year. The couple is delighted at the offer, until Hutch makes a remark about lighting candles and "roast mules" that causes Rosemary to regard her dream as a possible forewarning of future events.

The anagram
The book contains the anagram puzzle "roast mules". Levin never gives the answer to his readers, simply saying that it is a word that most five-year-old children would recognize. However, many online users speculate that it could be "somersault." Some have also suggested "soul master" (though that is two words, not a single word).

The ending
After Rosemary wakes up, she receives a phone call from her friend Hutch, who suggests that Rosemary and Guy would move to an apartment in the Dakota. He mentions that one of The Beatles is looking into buying an apartment there. This comment may be treated as an inside joke, since John Lennon and Yoko Ono did indeed purchase an apartment at the Dakota, in which the film Rosemary's Baby was filmed.

However, they purchased it in 1973, while Hutch tells Rosemary about this in 1965. This may be a hint that Rosemary did not wake up in the past, and did not dream all of the events of the novel.

Furthermore, in the center of the novel, there is an episode when Rosemary finds herself in Strawberry Fields, Lennon's memorial garden in Central Park. This takes place at the beginning of December, around the anniversary of Lennon's death. Having been in a coma for 27 years, she is not aware of Lennon's murder, and she does not recognize the word "Imagine" at the center of the garden. This episode remains unexplained in the novel, though it may be a hint that Rosemary did not dream it, as how could she dream Lennon's memorial garden, back in 1965?

Therefore, the ending may suggest that Satan does, in fact, kill Rosemary and drag her down into Hell (after admitting that he had lied to her when promising her eternal youth). Her "waking up" in 1965 is, in fact, the afterlife or Purgatory.

Reception
The book received withering pans from most critics. Writing in Entertainment Weekly, Alexandra Jacobs called it "senseless balderdash, a pity when you consider how gracefully Rosemary’s Baby flitted between the real and the fantastic, the paranoid and the paranormal. This resurrection only besmirches a devilishly good author’s track record." Publishers Weekly concurred: "After the nifty setup, the story drifts rather than lopes, with little suspense. There's little orginality here either."

Notes

1997 American novels
Novels by Ira Levin
Sequel novels
Dutton Penguin books
Fiction set in 1965
Fiction set in 1999
Fiction about the Devil
Novels about the Antichrist
Novels about nightmares